Clare Joanna Burrage is a British particle physicist at the University of Nottingham. She has made significant contributions to dark energy research, using astrophysical probes and interferometry.

Early life and education 
Burrage attributes her love of cosmology to driving past the Lovell Telescope at Jodrell Bank Observatory as a child. She attended Collingwood College, Surrey, achieving A-Levels in Mathematics, Further Mathematics and German. She studied Mathematics at the University of Cambridge, earning a Masters in 2004 and Part III of the Mathematical Tripos in 2005. Whilst a student, Burrage worked at Legoland Windsor Resort. For her postgraduate research she joined Anne-Christine Davis in the Department of Applied Maths and Theoretical Physics, studying Scalar Fields and the Accelerated Expansion of the Universe. She spotted signs of the elusive chameleon particle in the active galactic nucleus of Messier 87.

Research and career 
Burrage was appointed as a postdoctoral fellow in the theoretical physics group at DESY in 2008. Whilst at DESY she found astrophysical evidence for axion-photon conversion. She moved to the University of Geneva in 2010, working in cosmology. In 2011 Burrage was appointed the Anne McLaren Research Fellow at the University of Nottingham. Burrage uses observation of light from astrophysical sources to test for dark energy. She was awarded a Royal Society research fellowship in 2013 and again in 2018. She won the 2015 Institute of Physics Maxwell Medal and Prize. Burrage works with the Centre for Cold Matter at Imperial College London, where she develops light-pulse atom interferometers to accelerate atoms for force sensing. By combining astrophysical observations with atomic techniques, Burrage has provided the best constraints on the various ways dark energy can interact with matter.

Public engagement 
Burrage has taken part in several public engagement activities, including I'm a Scientist, Get Me Out of Here. She was part of a pairing program with a member of parliament and has presented her work at the Palace of Westminster. She has taken part in the Edinburgh International Festival and Hay Festival. She was selected by the British Council to represent the UK in Science Alive in Hong Kong. She has taken part in the award-winning physics video series Sixty Symbols.

Burrage was interviewed by Morgan Freeman in season 2 of Through the Wormhole.

References 

Particle physicists
21st-century British physicists
British women physicists
British expatriates in Switzerland
Alumni of the University of Cambridge
British cosmologists
Theoretical physicists
Science communicators
21st-century British women scientists
Academic staff of the University of Geneva
Living people
Year of birth missing (living people)